Philip W. Hedrick (born November 21, 1942) is an American emeritus professor at Arizona State University (ASU). From 1992 until his retirement, Hedrick was Ullman Professor of Conservation Biology at ASU.  Hedrick has published over 200 articles on the topics of population genetics and conservation biology. Among other organisms, he has published extensively on wolves and bighorn sheep.

Hedrick previously served as president of the American Society of Naturalists and the American Genetic Association, and in 1987 was made a fellow of the American Association for the Advancement of Science.

Selected publications
 Genetics of Populations (4th ed). 2011. Jones and Bartlett Publishers: Sudbury, Mass.

References

1942 births
Living people
American geneticists
Fellows of the American Association for the Advancement of Science
People from Massachusetts
Arizona State University faculty
Hanover College alumni
University of Minnesota alumni